The following article is a broad timeline of the Pokémon franchise, also known as Pocket Monsters in Japan, a Japanese media franchise managed by The Pokémon Company, a company founded by Nintendo, Game Freak, and Creatures.

The Pokémon franchise is divided into generations. In each new generation, a new set of Pokémon and a new region are introduced for the first time. The first generation began in Japan with the release of Pocket Monsters Red and Green on February 27, 1996. As of 2022, there are currently nine generations of main series video games.

Generation I: Kanto (1996–1999)

1996 

 February 27: Pocket Monsters Red & Green, the first ever Pokémon games and the primary games of Generation I, first released in Japan for the Game Boy
June 23: Nintendo 64 first released in Japan
 October 15: Pocket Monsters Blue, upper edition of Pocket Monsters Red & Green, first released in Japan for the Game Boy
 October 20: Pokémon Trading Card Game (TCG) first released

1997 

 March: Pokémon Adventures manga first released in Japan
 April 1: Pocket Monsters: Original Series, the first Japanese anime series, first aired in Japan with the release of the first episode of the 1st anime season, Pokemon, I Choose You!

1998 

 March 27: Pocket Pikachu released in Japan
April 23: Pokémon Center Co. Ltd established
April 25: First ever Pokémon Center, Pokémon Center Tokyo, opened in Tokyo, Japan
July 18: First ever Pokémon movie, Pokémon The First Movie: Mewtwo Strikes Back, first released in Japan
August 1: Pocket Monsters Stadium (Japanese version), a spinoff game,  released in Japan
 September 8: First English dub anime season, Pokémon: Indigo League, released in North America
 September 12: Pokémon Yellow, upper edition of Pocket Monsters Red & Green (1996), first released in Japan for the Game Boy & Game Boy Color
 September 28: Pokémon Red and Blue, the international version of Pocket Monsters Red & Green (1996) and the first Pokémon games released internationally, released in North America
October 21: Game Boy Color first released in Japan
December 12: Hey You, Pikachu!, a spinoff game, released in Japan for Nintendo 64
December 18: Pokémon Trading Card Game for Game Boy released

1999 

 January 21: Super Smash Bros. 64, crossover game, first released in Japan for Nintendo 64
 January 28: Pocket Monsters Episode: Orange Islands Adventures first aired in Japan
March 21: Pokémon Snap, a spinoff photography game, first released in Japan
April 14: Pokémon Pinball, a spinoff game, first released in Japan
April 30: Pokémon Stadium (known in Japan as Pokémon Stadium 2), a spinoff game, first released in Japan
July 17: Second Pokémon movie, Pokémon The Movie 2000: The Power of Us, first released in Japan
October 7: Softx changed its name to TV Tokyo MediaNet
October 14: Pocket Monsters Episode: Gold and Silver first aired in Japan
 December 4: Second English dub anime season, Pokémon: Adventures in the Orange Islands, released in the United States

Generation II: Johto (1999–2002)

1999 

 November 21: Pokémon Gold and Silver, primary games of Generation II, first released in Japan for the Game Boy Color

2000 

 July 18: Third Pokémon movie, Pokémon 3: The Movie: Spell of the Unown first released in Japan
 October 14: Third English dub anime season, Pokémon: The Johto Journeys, released in the United States
 December 14: Pokémon Crystal, upper edition of Pokémon Gold and Silver (1999), first released in Japan as the final main games for the Game Boy Color
 December 14: Pokémon Stadium 2 (known in Japan as Pokémon Stadium Gold and Silver) released in Japan

2001 

 February: Pokémon USA established
February 27: Fifth anniversary of the Pokémon video games and the Pokémon franchise
March 21: Game Boy Advance first released in Japan
July 7: Fourth Pokémon movie, Pokémon 4Ever Celebi: Voice of the Forest, first released in Japan
 August 18: Fourth English dub anime season, Pokémon: Johto League Champions, released in the United States
September 14: Nintendo GameCube first released in Japan
October 3: Pokémon Mini first released in Australia
October 20: Fifth anniversary of the Pokémon Trading Card Game
November 16: Pokemon Center New York opened in New York City
November 16: Pokémon Puzzle Collection first released in Japan
November 21: Super Smash Bros. Melee released for the Nintendo GameCube
December 4: Pokémon Zany Cards, a spinoff for Pokémon Mini, first released in Japan

2002 

 April 1: Fifth anniversary of the Pokémon anime
 July 13: Fifth Pokémon movie, Pokémon Heroes: Latios and Latias, first released in Japan
 September 14: Fifth English dub anime season, Pokémon: Master Quest, released in the United States

Generation III: Hoenn (2002–2006)

2002 

 November 21: Pokémon Ruby and Sapphire, primary games of Generation III and first main games for the Game Boy Advance, first released in Japan for the Game Boy Advance
 November 21: Pokémon Advanced Generation, The second Japanese anime series, first released in Japan

2003 

 February 14: Game Boy Advance SP first released in Japan
March 15: Sixth English dub anime season, Pokémon: Advanced, released in the United States
May 30: Pokémon Box Ruby & Sapphire first released
 July 19: Sixth Pokémon movie, Jirachi Wish Maker, first released in Japan
November 21: Pokémon Colosseum first released for Nintendo GameCube

2004 

 January 29: Pokémon FireRed and LeafGreen, remakes of Pocket Monsters Red and Green (1996) for the Game Boy and first ever remakes, first released in Japan for the Game Boy Advance
 July 17: Seventh Pokémon movie, Destiny Deoxys, first released in Japan
August 22: First ever Pokémon Trading Game World Championships held
September 2: TV Tokyo MediaNet was shortened to MediaNet
 September 11: Seventh English dub anime season, Pokémon: Advanced Challenge, released in the United States
 September 16: Pokémon Emerald, upper edition of Pokémon Ruby and Sapphire (2002) and final main games for the Game Boy Advance, first released in Japan for the Game Boy Advance
November 21: Nintendo DS first released in North America
 December 2: Pokémon Dash, a spinoff game, first released in Japan for the Nintendo DS

2005 

 March 18: Poképark, a theme park, opens in Japan
July 16: Eighth Pokémon movie, Lucario and the Mystery of Mew, first released in Japan
August 4: Pokémon XD: Gale of Darkness, a spinoff game, first released in Japan
September 13: Game Boy Micro first released in Japan
 September 17: Eighth English dub anime season, Pokémon: Advanced Battle, released in the United States
 October 20: Pokémon Trozei!, a spinoff game, first released in Japan for the Nintendo DS
 November 17; Pokémon Mystery Dungeon: Blue Rescue Team and Red Rescue Team, first games in the spinoff Mystery Dungeon series, first released in Japan for the Game Boy Advance and Nintendo DS, respectively

2006 

 February 27: Tenth anniversary of the Pokémon video games and the Pokémon franchise
March 2: Nintendo DS Lite first released in Japan
 March 23: Pokémon Ranger, first game in the spinoff Ranger series, first released in Japan for the Nintendo DS
 July 15: Ninth Pokémon movie, Pokémon Ranger and the Temple of the Sea, first released in Japan
 August 28: Pokémon Korea Inc. established
 September 8: Ninth English dub anime season, Pokémon: Battle Frontier, released in the United States
 October 20: Tenth anniversary of the Pokémon Trading Card Game.

Generation IV: Sinnoh (2006–2010)

2006 

 September 28: Pokémon Diamond and Pearl, primary games of Generation IV and first main games for the Nintendo DS, first released in Japan for the Nintendo DS
 September 28: Pokémon Diamond and Pearl, the Sinnoh anime saga & 3rd Japanese anime series, first released in Japan
November 19: Nintendo Wii first released in North America
December 14: Pokémon Battle Revolution, a spinoff game, first released in Japan for the Wii

2007 

 April 1: Tenth anniversary of the Pokémon anime
 April 20: Tenth English dub anime season, Pokémon: Diamond and Pearl, released in the United States
 July 14: Tenth Pokémon movie, The Rise of Darkrai, 1st movie in the Diamond and Pearl movie trilogy, first released in Japan
 September 13: Pokémon Mystery Dungeon: Explorers of Time and Explorers of Darkness, a spinoff game, first released in Japan for the Nintendo DS

2008 

 January 31: Super Smash Bros. Brawl, crossover game, first released in Japan for the Wii
March 20: Pokémon Ranger: Shadows of Almia, spinoff game and 2nd game in the Ranger series, first released in Japan
March 25: My Pokémon Ranch, a spinoff game, first released in Japan for the Wii
 April 12: Eleventh English dub anime season, Pokémon: Diamond and Pearl: Battle Dimension, released in the United States
June 16: Pokémon Rumble, a spinoff game, first released for the Wii
June 30: Shogakukan Productions changed its name to ShoPro
 July 19: Eleventh Pokémon movie, Giratina and the Sky Warrior, 2nd movie in the Diamond and Pearl movie trilogy, first released in Japan
August 4: Pokemon Mystery Dungeon: Keep Going! Blazing Adventure Squad, Pokémon Mystery Dungeon: Let's Go! Stormy Adventure Squad, and Pokémon Mystery Dungeon: Go For It! Light Adventure Squad released exclusively in Japan as a WiiWare title for the Wii
August 14: Pokémon World Championships first held
 September 13: Pokémon Platinum, upper edition of Pokémon Diamond and Pearl (2006), first released in Japan for the Nintendo DS
November 1: Nintendo DSi first released in Japan

2009 

 April 9: Pokémon Company International is established through the merger of Pokémon USA and Pokémon UK
April 18: Pokémon Explorers of Sky, upper edition of Pokémon Mystery Dungeon: Explorers of Time and Explorers of Darkness, first released in Japan
 May 9: Twelfth English dub anime season, Pokémon: Diamond and Pearl: Galactic Battles, released in the United States
 July 18: Twelfth Pokémon movie, Arceus and the Jewel of Life, 3rd movie in the Diamond and Pearl movie trilogy, first released in Japan
 September 12: Pokémon HeartGold and SoulSilver, remakes of Pokémon Gold and Silver (1999) for the Game Boy Color, first released in Japan for the Nintendo DS (in celebration of the 10th anniversary of Pokémon Gold and Silver)
November 21: Nintendo DSi XL first released in Japan
December 5: PokéPark Wii: Pikachu's Adventure, a spinoff game, first released in Japan for the Wii

2010 

 March 6: Pokémon Ranger: Guardian Signs, a spinoff game and third and most-recent game in the Ranger series, first released in Japan for the Nintendo DS
 June 5: Thirteenth English dub anime season, Pokémon: Diamond and Pearl: Sinnoh League Victors, released in the United States
 July 10: Thirteenth Pokémon movie, Zoroark: Master of Illusions, first released in Japan

Generation V: Unova (2010–2013)

2010 

 September 18: Pokémon Black and White, primary games of Generation V, first released in Japan for the Nintendo DS
 September 23: Pokémon: Best Wishes!, the Unova anime saga and fourth Japanese anime series, first released in Japan
 October 13: Pokémon Global Link, an online portal, established (went offline, discontinued in 2020)

2011 

 February 12: Fourteenth English dub anime season, Pokémon: Black & White, released in the United States
February 26: Nintendo 3DS first released in Japan
 February 27: Fifteenth anniversary of the Pokémon video games and the Pokémon franchise
April 21: Learn with Pokémon: Typing Adventure, spinoff educational game, first released in Japan for the Nintendo DS (only released in Japan, Europe & Australia)
June 6: Pokédex 3D released for the Nintendo 3DS
 July 16: Fourteenth movie, Pokémon the Movie: Black—Victini and Reshiram and White—Victini and Zekrom, the first dual Pokemon movies, first released in Japan
 October 20: Fifteenth anniversary of the Pokémon Trading Card Game
 November 12: PokéPark 2: Wonders Beyond first released in Japan for the Wii

2012 

 February 18: Fifteenth English dub anime season, Pokémon: Black & White: Rival Destinies, released in the United States
 March 17: Pokémon Conquest, a spinoff game, first released in Japan for the Nintendo DS
 April 1: Fifteenth anniversary of the Pokémon anime
 June 21: Pokémon Best Wishes Season 2, subseries of the Best Wishes! series, first released in Japan
 June 23: Pokémon Black 2 and White 2, sequel to Pokémon Black and White (2010), first ever sequel games and the final main games for the Nintendo DS, first released in Japan for the Nintendo DS
June 23: Pokémon Dream Radar first released in Japan for the Nintendo DS
 July 14: Fifteenth Pokémon movie, Kyurem vs. the Sword of Justice, first released in Japan
July 28: Nintendo 3DS XL first released in Japan & Europe
November 18: Wii U first released in North America
 November 23: Pokémon Mystery Dungeon Gates to Infinity, a spinoff game, first released in Japan for the Nintendo 3DS

2013 

 January 17: Pokémon Best Wishes Season 2 Episode N, a subseries of Pokémon Best Wishes!, first released in Japan
 February 2: Sixteenth English dub anime season part 1 of 2, Pokémon: Black & White: Adventures in Unova, released in the United States
 February 8: Pokémon TV app first released
 April 24: Pokémon Rumble U first released
 April 25: Pokémon Best Wishes Season 2 Decolore Adventure first released
 July 13: Sixteenth Pokémon movie, Genesect and the Legend Awakened, first released in Japan
 July 27: Sixteenth English dub anime season part 2 of 2, Pokémon: Black & White: Adventures in Unova and Beyond, released in the United States
 October 2: Pokémon Origins, a special mini anime series, first released

Generation VI: Kalos (2013–2016)

2013 

 October 12: Pokémon X and Y, primary games of Generation VI and first main games for Nintendo 3DS, first released worldwide for the Nintendo 3DS; first games released simultaneously worldwide
October 12: Nintendo 2DS first released in the West
 October 17: Pokémon: X Y, fifth anime series, first released in Japan
 October 19: Seventeenth English dub anime season, Pokémon the Series: XY, released in the United States; Pokémon English dub anime is rebranded as "Pokémon the Series"
 December 25: Pokémon Bank released worldwide for Nintendo 3DS

2014 

 July 19: Seventeenth Pokémon movie, Diancie and the Cocoon of Destruction, first released in Japan
September 13: Super Smash Bros. for Nintendo 3DS, crossover game, first released in Japan
October 11: New Nintendo 3DS & the New Nintendo 3DS XL first released in Japan
 November 21: Pokémon Omega Ruby and Alpha Sapphire, remakes of Pokémon Ruby and Sapphire (2002) for the Game Boy Advance, released worldwide (except Europe on November 28) for the Nintendo 3DS on the twelfth anniversary of Pokémon Ruby and Sapphire (2002)
November 21: Super Smash Bros. for Wii U, crossover game, first released in North America

2015 

 February 7: Eighteenth English dub anime season, Pokémon the Series: XY Kalos Quest, released in the United States
 February 18: Pokémon Shuffle released worldwide for the Nintendo 3DS
 May 7: Pokémon Jukebox, a music app only for Android first released in Japan
 July 18: Eighteenth Pokémon movie, Hoopa and the Clash of Ages, first released in Japan
 September 9: Pokémon Super Mystery Dungeon, a spinoff game in the Mystery Dungeon series, first released in Japan for the Nintendo 3DS
September 10: Pokémon GO Press Conference announces Pokémon GO for summer 2016
 October 29: Pokémon XYZ, a subseries of Pokémon XY Japanese anime series, first airs in Japan
December 2: Pokémon Picross, a spinoff game, first released in Japan for the Nintendo 3DS

2016 

 February 7: Pokémon twentieth anniversary commercial airs during Super Bowl 50
February 20: Nineteenth English dub anime season, Pokémon the Series: XYZ, released in the United States
 February 27: Twentieth anniversary of the Pokémon video games and the Pokémon franchise
 February 27: Pocket Monsters Red, Green, Blue, (1996) and Yellow (1998), originally released for the Game Boy, re-released worldwide for the Nintendo 3DS via Nintendo 3DS Virtual Console
March 18: Pokkén Tournament released worldwide for the Wii U
April 12: Pokémon Duel, a spinoff mobile game, first released in Japan for Android (shut down on October 31, 2019)
July 6: Pokémon GO, geolocation-based mobile game, first released in Australia, New Zealand, and the United States for iOS and Android
 July 16: Nineteenth Pokémon movie, Volcanion and the Mechanical Marvel, the most recent main timeline movie, first released in Japan
 September 16: Pokémon Generations, a special mini anime series, first released
 October 20: Twentieth anniversary of the Pokémon Trading Card Game

Generation VII: Alola (2016–2019)

2016 

 November 17: Pokémon Sun and Moon, sixth anime series, first released in Japan
 November 18: Pokémon Sun and Moon, primary games of Generation VII, released worldwide for the Nintendo 3DS
 December 5: Twentieth English dub anime season, Pokémon the Series: Sun & Moon, released in the United States
 December 9: Pokémon TCG - Sun and Moon first released

2017 

 March 3: Nintendo Switch released worldwide in most regions
 April 1: Twentieth anniversary of the Pokémon anime
June 15: New Nintendo 2DS XL first released in Australia
July 15: Twentieth Pokémon movie, I Choose You!, the first alternate timeline movie, first released in Japan
September 22: Pokémon Gold and Silver (1999), originally released for the Game Boy Color, re-released worldwide for the Nintendo 3DS via Nintendo 3DS Virtual Console
September 22: Pokken Tournament DX released worldwide for the Nintendo Switch
 November 17: Pokémon Ultra Sun and Ultra Moon, upper editions of Pokémon Sun and Moon (2016), released worldwide for the Nintendo 3DS

2018 

 January 26: Pokémon Crystal (2000), originally released for the Game Boy Color, re-released worldwide for the Nintendo 3DS via Nintendo 3DS Virtual Console
March 23: Detective Pikachu, spinoff game first released for Nintendo 3DS
 March 28: Twenty-first English dub anime season, Pokémon the Series: Sun & Moon – Ultra Adventures, released in the United States
May 30: Pokémon 2018 Video Game Press Conference announces Pokémon: Let's Go, Pikachu! and Let's Go, Eevee!, untitled future core game for Nintendo Switch, spin-off game Pokémon Quest for the Nintendo Switch & mobile devices
 May 30: Pokémon Quest, a spinoff game, released for mobile
 July 13: Twenty-first Pokémon movie, The Power of Us, first released in Japan
 November 16: Pokémon: Let's Go, Pikachu! and Let's Go, Eevee!, remakes of Pokémon Yellow (1998) for the Game Boy Color and first main Nintendo Switch games, released worldwide for the Nintendo Switch in celebration of the Twentieth anniversary of Pokémon Yellow (1998)
 December 7: Super Smash Bros. Ultimate, crossover game, released for the Nintendo Switch

2019 

 March 23: Twenty-second English dub anime season, Pokémon the Series: Sun & Moon – Ultra Legends, released in the United States
May 1: Pokémon Pass, a mobile app for scanning Pokémon gifts, launches exclusively in the United States
May 3: Detective Pikachu, the first live action film, first airs in theatres in Japan
May 10: Detective Pikachu, the first live action film, released in the West
May 27: Pokémon 2019 Press Conference announces Detective Pikachu sequel for the Nintendo Switch, the cloud service Pokémon HOME, the mobile app Pokémon Sleep, the Pokémon GO Plus + device, and the spin-off game Pokémon Masters for mobile devices
 July 12: Twenty-second Pokémon movie, Mewtwo Strikes Back: EVOLUTION, remake of the first Pokemon movie and first CGI, first released in Japan
 August 29: Pokémon Masters, (now called Pokemon Masters Ex since August 2020) mobile spinoff game released
September 20: Nintendo Switch Lite released worldwide
October 31: Pokémon Duel permanently shuts down

Generation VIII: Galar (2019–2022)

2019 

 November 15: Pokémon Sword and Shield, primary games of Generation VIII, released worldwide for the Nintendo Switch
 November 17: Pocket Monsters, the seventh anime series and first series to focus on all current regions, first aired in Japan
 December 6: Pokémon Sword and Shield TCG released

2020 

 January 15: Pokémon Twilight Wings, a special mini web anime series, first airs
 February 12: Pokémon Home released worldwide for the Nintendo Switch and mobile devices
 February 27: Mewtwo Strikes Back: EVOLUTION, the 22nd Pokémon movie, released worldwide on Netflix; first movie to premiere on Netflix
 March 6: Pokémon Mystery Dungeon Rescue Team DX, spinoff and remake of Pokémon Mystery Dungeon: Blue Rescue Team and Red Rescue Team (2005), released worldwide for the Nintendo Switch
 May 9: Twenty-third English dub anime season, Pokémon Journeys: The Series, first released in Canada
 June 12: Twenty-third English dub anime season premieres on Netflix for the very first time with the Netflix release of Pokémon Journeys: The Series in the United States
 June 17: Pokémon Sword and Shield: The Isle of Armor, 1st of 2 DLCs for Pokémon Sword and Shield (2019), released worldwide for the Nintendo Switch
June 17: Pokémon Presents is held for the first time
 June 17: Pokémon Smile, a spinoff mobile game, released worldwide
 June 24: Pokémon Café Mix, a spinoff mobile game, released worldwide
 August 29: Pokémon Masters, a spinoff mobile game, renamed as Pokémon Masters Ex for its 1st anniversary
 October 22: Pokémon Sword and Shield: Crown Tundra, 2nd of 2 DLCs for Pokémon Sword and Shield (2019), released worldwide for the Nintendo Switch
 December 25: Twenty-third Pokémon movie, Secrets of the Jungle, first released in Japan; originally scheduled for July 12 but delayed due to the COVID-19 pandemic in Japan

2021 
February 27: Twenty-fifth anniversary of the Pokémon video games and the Pokémon franchise; Pokémon25 Virtual Concert with Post Malone
April 30: New Pokémon Snap, a spinoff game, released worldwide for the Nintendo Switch
May 14: "Electric" by American pop singer Katy Perry, the lead single of the Pokémon 25 music album, is released
June 12: Twenty-fourth English dub anime season, Pokémon Master Journeys: The Series, season premiere in Canada
July 6: Fifth anniversary of Pokémon GO, mobile game
July 21: Pokémon Unite, a spinoff MOBA mobile game, released for Nintendo Switch
September 9: Pokémon Evolutions, a special mini web anime series celebrating the 25th anniversary, first airs
September 10: Twenty-fourth English dub anime season premieres on Netflix with the Netflix release of Pokémon Master Journeys: The Series in the United States

September 22: Pokémon Unite, a spinoff MOBA mobile game, mobile release for iOS and Android
October 8: Nintendo Switch OLED model worldwide release
October 15: Release of Pokémon 25: The Album, featuring Katy Perry,  Post Malone, J Balvin, Lil Yachty, Tierra Whack, Vince Staples, Zhu & more
October 20: Twenty-fifth anniversary of the Pokémon Trading Card Game
October 28: Pokémon Cafe Mix renamed Pokémon Café ReMix
November 19: Pokémon Brilliant Diamond and Shining Pearl, remakes of Pokémon Diamond and Pearl (2006) for the Nintendo DS, worldwide release for the Nintendo Switch in celebration of the 15th anniversary of Pokémon Diamond and Pearl (2006)

2022 
January 28: Pokémon Legends: Arceus, prequels to Pokémon Diamond and Pearl (2006), worldwide release for the Nintendo Switch
April 1: Twenty-fifth anniversary of the Pokémon anime in Japan
May 18: Pokémon: Hisuian Snow, a special mini web anime series, first airs
May 28: Twenty-fifth English dub anime season, Pokémon Ultimate Journeys: The Series, first released in Canada
October 21: Twenty-fifth English dub anime season premieres on Netflix with the Netflix release of Pokémon Ultimate Journeys: The Series in the United States

Generation IX: Paldea (2022–)

2022 
November 18: Pokémon Scarlet and Violet, primary games of Generation IX, released worldwide for the Nintendo Switch

Future dates TBA 

 Untitled Detective Pikachu film sequel
Untitled Detective Pikachu (video game) sequel
 Pokémon Sleep, a spinoff mobile game that tracks the amount of time a user sleeps

References

External links 

 Official Pokémon website
 Official Japanese Pokémon website 

Pokémon
Timelines of mass media